Nass Marrakesh is a Gnawa music group formed in 1991. They have evolved in directions unknown before for Gnawa musicians with the introduction of instruments foreign to Gnawa music such as the djembe, tam-tam, mandolin, tabla and Afro-Cuban percussion.

Line up
 "Moulay Sherif"- Mandolin, oud, vocals and Krakebs.
 Abdeljalil Kodssi- Vocals and percussion.
 Abdelaziz Arradi- Vocals and sintir (traditional bass)

Discography
Albums
Bouderbala
Sabil asalaam (Alula Records)

Contributing artist
 The Rough Guide to the Music of Morocco (2004, World Music Network)

See also
Music of Morocco
Gnawa

References

Nass Marrakech on Moroccanmusic.com

Moroccan musical groups
Marrakesh